The 1916–17 National Challenge Cup was the fourth annual cup tournament held by the United States Football Association. On May 5, 1917, Fall River Rovers defeated Bethlehem Steel to take the title.  Thomas Swords scored the game-winning goal thirty seconds into the game. The second round match on January 28 between Bay Ridge of Brooklyn and the Newark Scottish-Americans was originally awarded to Bay Ridge for non-appearance of the Scots. Despite Bay Ridge having played and won their third-round game 2-0 over New York, the Bay Ridge/Scots game was ordered replayed by the cup committee. The Scots won the replay and went on to face New York in the third round.

Bracket
Home teams listed on top of bracket

(*) replay after tied match
w/o walkover/forfeit victory awarded

Final

See also
1917 American Cup

Sources
USOpenCup.com

References

Nat
U.S. Open Cup